The Landmine Museum is a museum in Lieyu Township, Kinmen County, Taiwan.

History
The museum was opened in mid 2012 by capitalizing the military history left from the Taiwan Strait Crisis legacies.

Architecture
The museum is located inside an underground tunnel connecting Tiehan Fort and Yongshi Fort.

Exhibitions
The museum displays various information on the history and different types of land mines.

References

2012 establishments in Taiwan
Lieyu Township
Museums established in 2012
Museums in Kinmen County